Bork is a fictional character, a superhero in the DC Comics universe. Created by Bob Haney and Neal Adams, the character first appeared in The Brave and the Bold #81 (December 1968) and was later re-introduced in JLA #61/2 (February 2002).

Fictional character biography

Early years
Carl Andrew Bork was a criminal dock worker from Gotham City who went by the nickname King of the Docks. After a shipboard theft in the South Pacific during which he saved a young native boy from drowning, he discovers Desolation Island. In thanks for Bork's rescue of the young boy, the Desolation Island natives give him a 'magic' statue which eventually transforms him, and makes him invulnerable to physical harm. The Flash found the statue on Desolation Island and tried to destroy it, but all his attempts failed until he was able to throw it into the sun. Once the statue was destroyed Bork's invulnerability disappeared.

Bork served hard time in the Van Kull Maximum Security facility outside Metropolis. While in prison, his body began to mutate. His invulnerability returned along with super-strength and an increasingly deformed physique. He escaped Van Kull, and was opposed by Batman and the Flash, but managed to elude them and visit his mother in Newark, New Jersey. After his mother collapsed from a weak heart, Batman talked Bork into surrendering himself to the authorities on the condition that they help her to get well.
Bork peacefully served the remainder of his prison sentence, and Batman arranged for his mother to get the best medical treatment available, and had the Wayne Foundation pay her hospital bills.

The Power Company
After his parole, Bork attempted to find gainful legitimate employment, but was hampered by the disadvantages of his criminal record and monstrous appearance. He was later approached by Josiah Power with a job offer to join a new corporate heroes-for-hire organization called the Power Company. Bork accepted Josiah's offer and joined the team as an associate, later becoming roommates with co-worker Sapphire.

One Year Later

In JSA Classified #19, Bork is an unwilling participant in one of Roulette's metahuman brawls, fighting against the current Son of Vulcan.

In Superman #663, Bork is a client of Oblivion Bar with Witchfire and Traci Thirteen.

In other media
 Carl Bork appears on  The Flash episode "Seeing Red". He was killed by Cicada in the beginning of the episode.

References

DC Comics characters with superhuman strength
DC Comics metahumans
DC Comics superheroes
DC Comics supervillains
DC Comics characters who use magic
Characters created by Bob Haney
Characters created by Neal Adams
Fictional characters with superhuman durability or invulnerability
Fictional monsters